Shady Grove Park was a trolley park in Lemont Furnace, Pennsylvania. (Near Uniontown) It still operated as a campground and public pool for many years until 2012, when the pool was closed, and the current status of the park and campground is listed as permanently closed.

Park History 
Opened in 1905 to help boost ridership on the West Penn Railways streetcar line, the park was originally a picnic grove and landscaped wooded leisure area like many early Trolley Parks of the time period.  Built on the edge of a small artificial lake, boating and swimming were one of the first amusements offered at the park in its earliest days.  Much like Kennywood in nearby Pittsburgh, the park began to acquire rides and build amusements in the years following its founding.  A large concrete swimming pool replaced the artificial lake as the park's main water feature sometime in the 1930s, and the pool continued to be in operation until its age and changing safety regulations for public pools caused the park to drain it permanently in 2012.

In its heyday Shady Grove also included a roller coaster, ferris wheel, a fun house referred to as the "House of Mirth" in an old news article, a theater, shooting gallery, photo gallery, a restaurant, and two large dance pavilions.  The rollercoaster was a large wooden coaster that climbed, twisted and turned its way along the entire length of the property.  Built in 1925 and named the Wildcat, it was reported to have been designed by Traver Engineering of Beaver Falls, Pa.  The dance halls attracted some of the top names of the jazz age in its day, and many vintage articles and newsclippings can be found online from touring bands and singers making the park a destination on their tours for several decades.

In later years additions were made of a rollerskating rink, aeroplane swing, merry-go-round, a junior ride-on railway, and child sized versions of many of the adult rides. A fire in 1937 damaged and destroyed several of the park's structures and rides, including the rollercoaster, but the park recovered to continue operating as an amusement park and popular picnic and dancing destination well into the 1960s.  Eventually, the decision was made to remove the remaining rides in the early 1970s and alter the pool's fountain due to increasing maintenance costs, and safety concerns after a drowning under the arches of the pool's concrete fountain.  The park continued to operate as a picnic destination and public pool until its closing.

The Park after closing

All that remains of Shady Grove Park currently is the shuttered property, a few boarded-up structures, and an empty concrete pool.  One of the cars from the rollercoaster survives at Kennywood somewhere in their storage, and was on display for several years at the entrance to the Lost Kennywood section of the park when they first opened the area in 1995, along with several photos of Shady Grove park in its heyday in the exhibits displayed there at the time.  Several concrete footings from former rides can be found buried in the wooded area adjoining the grassy maintained part of Shady Grove's property, the only remaining hints at its past as a thriving amusement park.

References

External links
 Article on early park history: http://triblive.com/neighborhoods/yourmonvalley/yourmonvalleymore/5709631-74/park-charleroi-coyle
 Newsclipping advertising Jelly Roll Morton performing at the park:  http://www.doctorjazz.co.uk/mh10june29.jpg
 http://www.waymarking.com/waymarks/WMC0AQ_Shady_Grove_Park_Pool_Lemont_Furnace_Pennsylvania
 More park history and photos of the fire:  https://www.facebook.com/dunbarhistoricalsociety/posts/1109292219142814:0

Defunct amusement parks in Pennsylvania
Amusement parks in Pennsylvania
1937 fires in the United States
Buildings and structures in Fayette County, Pennsylvania